Iherir (also written Ihrir) is a village in the commune of Bordj El Houasse, in Djanet District, Illizi Province, Algeria. The area has been populated since Neolithic times; the population living in the valley (including a village to the southeast called Idarane) has been continuously over 1000 during the 20th century.

Geography
Its valley is an oasis containing gueltas and numerous date palms. Prehistoric art dated to 9000 BC is found in the Iheren sites on the nearby Tadjelahine plateau. The valley is protected as a nature park, but protection applies only to the frescoes, not to the fauna or flora. It is also considered a "wetland of global interest" by the Ramsar Convention (2001).

The gueltas near Iherir are flanked by Cape bulrush (Typha capensis), with oleanders (Nerium oleander) and French Tamarisks (Tamarix gallica) abundant along the river bed. Notable animals include jungle cats (Felis chaus) and sand cats (Felis margarita).

Climate
Iherir has a hot desert climate (Köppen climate classification BWh), with very hot summers and mild winters, and very little precipitation throughout the year. Rainfall is very erratic, with as much as  falling locally in some years due storms resulting from the temporary extension of the Intertropical Convergence Zone into the area. When rain does fall, water may flow continuously in Oued Iherir for as long as six months. Snow has been recorded several times on the highest nearby mountains.

Economy
The local economy is centered on agriculture, with production of wheat, dates, figs, grapes, and root crops. Camels, cattle and goats are grazed, and fishing from the gueltas is also significant. There is also some tourism associated mainly with the nearby frescoes.

Transportation
There are no paved roads to the town, which is accessible only by rough tracks. The main track leads south to the N3 national highway between Illizi and Bordj El Houasse.

References

Neighbouring towns and cities

Populated places in Illizi Province
Oases of Algeria
Djanet District